David Lesley Goatham, better known by his pen name David Lambkin, is an English novelist.

Background 
Born in the United Kingdom, he spent many years in South Africa and Kenya. Lambkin divides his time between running his advertising agency in Johannesburg and writing novels and articles (for National Geographic i.a.).

Writing 
Lambkin's novels are mainly crime fiction set in Kenya with White protagonists.

Lambkin won the South African Central News Agency Literary Award for best debut work for his first novel, "Plain of Darkness", in 1992. He was voted "Author of the Year" by The Star (South Africa) newspaper in 1995 for his novel "The Hanging Tree" and in 2002 for "Night Jasmine Man". Both "The Hanging Tree" and "Night Jasmine Man" are set in Kenya. His fourth novel, "The Voyeur" is set on Zanzibar. Lambkin is also compiling a cookbook on Swahili cuisine and has written scripts for wildlife documentaries.

His books have been reviewed in Publishers Weekly, Chicago Tribune, World Literature Today, Kirkus Reviews among other places.

Hobbies 
Lambkin is an amateur naturalist, clay pigeon shot, fisherman, wine lover, fan of Johann Sebastian Bach and Ludwig van Beethoven, and an enthusiastic albeit untrained cook.

Publications
Plain of Darkness (1992)
The Hanging Tree (1995) 
Night Jasmine Man (2002)
The Voyeur (2005)

References

 The Hanging Tree by David Lambkin | Kirkus

20th-century English novelists
21st-century English novelists
Living people
1947 births
English male novelists
20th-century English male writers
21st-century English male writers